Heidi Grande Røys (born 6 May 1967) is a Norwegian politician for the Socialist Left Party. She became Minister of Modernisation in 2005, renamed to Minister of Government Administration and Reform since 2006 in the second cabinet Stoltenberg. She was replaced by Rigmor Aasrud in 2009.

References

1967 births
Living people
Government ministers of Norway
Socialist Left Party (Norway) politicians
Members of the Storting
Women government ministers of Norway
21st-century Norwegian politicians
21st-century Norwegian women politicians
Women members of the Storting